These are the Canadian number-one country songs of 1989, per the RPM Country Tracks chart.

See also
1989 in music
List of number-one country hits of 1989 (U.S.)

References

External links
 Read about RPM Magazine at the AV Trust
 Search RPM charts here at Library and Archives Canada

1989 in Canadian music
Canada Country
1989